The Greener Yard is a 1949 animated short film featuring Donald Duck.  It was released by Walt Disney Productions.

Plot
Bootle Beetle lives next door to Donald Duck.  He explains to a younger beetle the dangers of Donald's garden by tell the stories of his battles with Donald.

Voice cast
Clarence Nash as Donald Duck
Dink Trout as Bootle Beetle
Florence Gill as the hens

Home media
The short was released on December 11, 2007 on Walt Disney Treasures: The Chronological Donald, Volume Three: 1947-1950.

References

External links
 
 

1949 films
1949 animated films
1940s Disney animated short films
Donald Duck short films
Films produced by Walt Disney
Films scored by Oliver Wallace